Beaver Trap Creek is a stream in the U.S. state of South Dakota.

Some say the creek was named for the fact it was a favorite hunting ground of beavers by Indians, while others believe the creek was named for the abandoned beaver trap which was found there.

See also
List of rivers of South Dakota

References

Rivers of Ziebach County, South Dakota
Rivers of South Dakota